Re Bird Precision Bellows Ltd [1984] Ch 658 is a UK company law and UK insolvency law case concerning unfair prejudice.

Facts
The majority was ordered to buy the 26% minority in a quasi-partnership under the old Companies Act 1980 section 75, now Companies Act 2006 section 996. There was then a dispute as to the basis on which the court should fix the price, and in particular whether there should be any discount to reflect the fact that the petitioners only had a minority holding.

Nourse J held that the price should be determined on a pro rata basis, without any discount.

Judgment
The Court of Appeal upheld Nourse J and although this was on the basis that this was a proper exercise of the judge’s discretion, Oliver LJ (at p. 674B–C; 99,475) made it clear that he would not himself have come to any other conclusion. Generally there is no discount for the fact that one is a minority shareholder. But the exception is where shareholders acquired their shares as an investment (so they probably would have paid less for a minority stake anyway).

See also

UK company law

Notes

References

United Kingdom company case law
Court of Appeal (England and Wales) cases
1984 in case law
1984 in British law